Meneghinite is a sulfosalt mineral with the chemical formula CuPb13 Sb7S24.

It is a blackish lead-grey in colour and gives a black shining streak. Its lustre is metallic.

Discovered in the Italian Province of Lucca in 1852, it is named after Giuseppe Meneghini (1811–1889) of the University of Pisa, who first observed the species. The Bottino Mine in Lucca is the type locality.

References

Sulfosalt minerals
Lead minerals
Copper(I) minerals
Antimony minerals
Orthorhombic minerals
Minerals in space group 62